Clinidium corbis is a species of ground beetle in the subfamily Rhysodinae. It was described by R.T. Bell in 1970. It is endemic to Hispaniola. Clinidium corbis measure  in length.

References

Clinidium
Beetles of North America
Endemic fauna of Hispaniola
Insects of the Dominican Republic
Insects of Haiti
Beetles described in 1970